Iceburn, known later as the Iceburn Collective, was a musical group formed in 1991 in Salt Lake City, Utah, US, by guitarist/vocalist/composer Gentry Densley, the sole constant member through multiple personnel changes. They were known for their unique style that combined elements of jazz, heavy metal, punk, and classical music. Releasing albums on Revelation Records and Victory Records, Iceburn achieved little mainstream attention, but earned critical praise for their unusual music.

Band history 
Their early output could be classified as jazzcore, blending the speed and energy of hardcore punk and metal with the intricacy of jazz and progressive rock. For their first few years and albums, Iceburn were, for the most part, a classic "power trio" of guitar, bass guitar and drums.

Around 1996, with the release of Meditavolutions, a 70-minute continuous piece in the form of a musical palindrome, the band began to go by the name the Iceburn Collective, to reflect the dynamic nature of the group's membership. The lineup expanded with a saxophonist, percussionist on conga drums, and a second guitarist. Critic Bret Love writes of the album, "the eclectic sound of this Utah-based septet flows so seamlessly that it may take a few songs before you realize you've never heard anything quite like it."

The band gradually introduced more and more improvisation. By the time they disbanded in about 2000, Iceburn was a completely improvised avant-garde jazz unit, featuring saxophone and other woodwind instruments.

Densley went on to participate in Ascend, a collaboration with Greg Anderson.

Most of their albums featured artwork by Californian Rich Jacobs.

Iceburn reunited for one concert in February 2007 to celebrate the 18th anniversary of Slug Mag (Salt Lake Underground, devoted to local music and arts), a longtime booster for Iceburn and Densely's music.

Discography

Albums 
 Firon (1992), Victory Records
 Hephaestus (1993), Revelation Records
 Iceburn/Engine Kid split cd/12" (1994), Revelation Records
 Poetry of Fire (1994), Revelation Records
 Meditavolutions (1996), Revelation Records
 Polar Bear Suite (1997), Iceburn Records/Revelation Records
 Power of the Lion (1998), Iceburn Records/Revelation Records (Reissued on vinyl by Southern Lord in 2009)
 Speed of Light Voice of Thunder (1999), Iceburn Records
 Land of Wind and Ghosts (2000), Mountain Collective Records MTN-CIA
Asclepius (2021), Southern Lord

Singles 
 Burn b/w Fall, Victory Records
 Moon b/w Brew No. 9, Art Monk Construction
 Leos 12", Lionhead Records
 Zu/Iceburn - PhonoMetak 10" Series No. 1, Odin's Beard 10" split with Zu  (2006), Wallace Records (Italy)

References 

Musical groups from Utah
American post-hardcore musical groups
American avant-garde metal musical groups
Victory Records artists
Revelation Records artists
Musical groups established in 1991
1991 establishments in Utah